Zip Auto, at 251 W. Main St. in Missoula, Montana, was built in 1937 and was listed on the National Register of Historic Places in 1990.

It was designed by Missoula architect H. E. Kirkemo.  It is an Art Moderne-style L-shaped one-story flat-roofed poured concrete structure with four garage bays.

References

Transportation buildings and structures on the National Register of Historic Places in Montana
National Register of Historic Places in Missoula, Montana
Commercial buildings completed in 1937
1937 establishments in Montana
Automobile repair shops
Art Moderne architecture